The 2021–22 Danish 1st Division season was the 26th season of the Danish 1st Division league championship, governed by the Danish Football Association.

Participants
Lyngby Boldklub and AC Horsens finished the 2020–21 season of the Superliga in 11th and 12th place, respectively, and were relegated to the 1st Division. They replaced Viborg FF and Silkeborg IF, who were promoted to the 2021–22 Danish Superliga.

Nykøbing FC and Jammerbugt FC won promotion from the 2020–21 Danish 2nd Divisions. They replaced Kolding IF and Skive IK.

Stadia and locations

Personnel and sponsoring 
Note: Flags indicate national team as has been defined under FIFA eligibility rules. Players and Managers may hold more than one non-FIFA nationality.

Managerial changes

League table

Positions by round

Promotion Group
The top 6 teams will compete for 2 spots in the 2022–23 Danish Superliga.
Points and goals carried over in full from the regular season.

Relegation Group
The bottom 6 teams will compete to avoid the 2 relegations spots to the 2022–23 Danish 2nd Division.
Points and goals carried over in full from the regular season.

References

External links
  Danish FA

2021–22 in Danish football
Danish 1st Division
Danish 1st Division seasons